Carley is both a given name and a surname. Notable people with the name include:

Given name
 Carley Garner (born 1977), American commodity market strategist, broker and author
 Carley Gracie, Brazilian-born male martial artist
 Carley Mijović (born 1994), Australian basketball player
 Carley Stenson (born 1982), English actress and singer

Surname
 Christopher Carley (born 1978), American actor
 George H. Carley (1938-2020), American judge and lawyer
 James A. Carley (1869-1952), American lawyer and politician
 James Carley, Canadian historian
 Patrick J. Carley (1866–1936), American politician

See also

Carle, surnames
Carle (given name)
Carlee
Carles (name)
Carlye J. Hughes
Curley
Karley